Arlington Catholic High School (ACHS) is a coeducational Catholic high school in Arlington, Massachusetts.  It is located in the Roman Catholic Archdiocese of Boston and serves grades 9-12.

History
The members of St. Agnes Parish, a Catholic church in Arlington, established the school in 1960. Monsignor Oscar O’Gorman headed the school's development. Initially the school had 9th grade students. The rear of the school building includes a portion of the Russell School, a Victorian-style school building first built in 1873. In 1956 Russell School closed due to the opening of nearby Francis E. Thompson Elementary School, and the first and second floors of the building were built into the Arlington Catholic facility.

Arlington Catholic's first class graduated in 1964.

Student body
 the school has about 650 students, including American students and students who were citizens of eight other countries. Students reside in over 47 communities in the area. Over 50 churches within the Roman Catholic Archdiocese of Boston had members who were students.

Athletics and student culture
 the school's athletic program has twenty-six sports which have varsity-level teams.

In addition there are twenty-three activity programs and student clubs.

Notable alumni
 Vicki Movsessian '90 - US Women's Hockey Team Olympic gold medalist in Nagano in 1998
 Julianne Nicholson '89 - actress (Law & Order: Criminal Intent)
 Mark J. Sullivan '72 - former Director of the United States Secret Service
 Larry Barton '74 - Author and Lead Instructor in Threat and Crisis Management, The FBI Academy

Notes and references

External links

 Official website

Catholic secondary schools in Massachusetts
Buildings and structures in Arlington, Massachusetts
Schools in Middlesex County, Massachusetts
Educational institutions established in 1960
1960 establishments in Massachusetts